Georgian-Japanese relations were established on August 3, 1992, just over one year since Georgia became independent from the Soviet Union. Since November 2006, Georgia has maintained an embassy in Tokyo. Japan has an embassy in Tbilisi.

Economy and foreign aid 
Japan has extended foreign aid to Georgia for various economic and cultural development projects. The balance of trade between the two nations is heavily in favor of Japan, with Japan exporting automobiles and manufactured goods, and Georgia exporting food products and chemicals.

Military cooperation 
In February 2011 Georgian Deputy Foreign Minister Nikoloz Vashakidze met with Director-General for International Affairs, Bureau of Defense Policy of the Japanese Defense Ministry Hiroshi Oe and discussed further prospects of military cooperation between Georgia and Japan during the meeting.

Japan's official statement on Abkhazia and South Ossetia 

Japan supports Georgia's territorial claims over Abkhazia and South Ossetia. On August 27, 2008, Masahiko Koumura Minister for Foreign Affairs of Japan issued the official statement entirely supporting Georgia's territorial integrity, which was followed by the formal recognition of the proclaimed republics by Russia on the previous day.

According to the October 2014 Joint Statement between Japan and Georgia on "Solidarity for Peace and Democracy": "Both sides shared the view that peaceful resolution to the conflict in Georgia's occupied regions of Abkhazia and Tskhinvali region/South Ossetia in line with the principles of sovereignty and territorial integrity of Georgia within its internationally recognized borders are essential for the peace and stability of the country and the entire South Caucasus region". Japan's position on "Georgia's occupied regions of Tskhinvali region/South Ossetia and Abkhazia" was reaffirmed in the 1 March 2017 statement by the Embassy of Japan in Georgia.

On March 29, 2022, during the Russo-Ukrainian War, the Embassy of Japan again issued an official statement to support the sovereignty and territorial integrity of Georgia and to deny the so-called "parliamentary elections" in Abkhazia held twice on that month.

High level visits 

Georgian President Eduard Shevardnadze made an official visit to Japan in March 1999 and President Mikheil Saakashvili visited Japan in March 2007.

In October 2014, Georgian President Giorgi Margvelashvili made a working visit to Tokyo, where Prime Minister Shinzo Abe mentioned to Margvelashvili that Georgia shared the same fundamental values with Japan and both leaders issued Joint Statement fully supporting the territorial integrity of Georgia, strengthening of economic relations between both countries, and other overall development objectives.

Diplomatic mission

Georgian Ambassadors to Japan 
 David Nozadze (chargé d'affaires, 2006-2008)
 Ivane Machavariani (2008-2009)
  (2010-2013)
 Levan Tsintsadze (2014-)

Japanese Ambassadors to Georgia 

 Sumio Edamura (in Moscow, 1992–1994)
 Koji Watanabe (in Moscow, 1994–1996)
  (in Moscow, 1996–1999)
  (in Moscow, 1999–2000)
 Tetsuya Hirose (in Baku, 2000–2002)
 Toshiyuki Fujiwara (in Baku, 2002–2004)
 Tadahiro Abe (in Baku, 2004–2007)
  (in Baku, 2007–2009)
  (2009-2012)
  (2013-2017)
  (2017-)

See also 
Foreign relations of Georgia
Foreign relations of Japan

External links 
 Georgian embassy in Tokyo
 Japanese embassy in Tbilisi

References 

 
Japan
Bilateral relations of Japan